The Vilayet of Baghdad (Modern Turkish: Bağdat Vilâyeti) was a first-level administrative division (vilayet) of the Ottoman Empire in modern-day central Iraq. The capital was Baghdad.

The accuracy of the population figures ranges from "approximate" to "merely conjectural" depending on the region from which they were gathered.

Demographics 
The last Ottoman Census of 1917 stated that in Baghdad Sanjak out of the 202,000 population, 88,000 were Jews, 12,000 Christian, 8,000 Kurds, 800 Persian and rest Arab and other Muslims.

History
In 1869, Midhat Pasha was inaugurated as governor of Baghdad. He extended Ottoman jurisdiction as far as the town of al-Bida, after he had established his authority in Nejd. In January 1872, Qatar was designated as a kaza under the Sanjak of Nejd. However, relations with the Ottoman authorities became hostile in both al-Bida and Nejd, leading eventually to the Battle of Al Wajbah, at which Ottomans were defeated.

Administrative divisions

Sanjaks or Districts of the vilayet:

Governors

Notable governors of the Vilayet:
 Hafiz Ahmed Midhat Shefik Pasha (March 1869 - November 1871)
 Giritli Sırrı Pasha

See also
 List of Ottoman governors of Baghdad

References

External links
 
 

 
1869 establishments in the Ottoman Empire
1918 disestablishments in the Ottoman Empire